John Baptist Schoeffel (11 May 1846 - d. Boston, 31 August 1918), was an American theatre manager and producer, and hotel owner. With Henry E. Abbey he was involved presenting European theatrical stars in the US, including Sarah Bernhardt, Henry Irving and Ellen Terry: and with Maurice Grau he and Abbey managed opera singers as Adelina Patti, Christina Nilsson, Ernestine Schumann-Heink, Francesco Tamagno and Fyodor Chaliapin in their tours of opera houses in Boston, Chicago and New York.

Career

He was born in Rochester, New York. He joined the theatre impresario Henry E. Abbey as his business partner in 1876. As a partner in the firm of Abbey, Schoeffel and Grau formed in 1880, he was involved in presenting grand opera during the 'Golden Age of singing' at the New York Metropolitan Opera House ("the old Met") in 1883 and from 1891 to 1903.

He was resident manager of the Park Theatre, Boston when it was built in 1879, and manager of the 1889 Tremont Theatre, Boston until his death.

Abbey and Schoeffel managed the 10-year-old Josef Hofmann when he toured the US, but he was stopped from playing because of overwork. A letter from Schoeffel from the Tremont Theatre dates from this period. Hofmann's agent in London was Narciso Vert, whose business became the well-known firm of Ibbs and Tillett.

He produced some plays at Daly's Theatre on Broadway in 1904 after Grau retired. One of these, Henrik Ibsen's Hedda Gabler, starred Nance O'Neill, a close friend of Lizzie Borden.

Personal life
In 1885 he married the Australian actress Agnes Booth (née Marion Agnes Land Rookes) (4 October 1841? - 2 January 1910), the widow of Junius Brutus Booth Jr., (brother of John Wilkes Booth and Edwin Booth, owner of Booth's Theatre) as her second husband.

Together they managed the huge Masconomo hotel in Manchester-by-the-Sea, Massachusetts until her death in 1910. He purchased the property outright at public auction in 1911, which changed hands before its complete destruction by fire in 1919.

Death
Schoeffel died at Massachusetts General Hospital, Boston, MA,  on 31 August 1918 after a stroke two weeks earlier. He was buried at the Mount Hope Cemetery, Rochester, NY.

Disambiguation
John Baptist Schoeffel is not to be confused with Lt. John Bernard Schoeffel, 9th Infantry, (1874–1940) who fought at the Battle of Manila in the Spanish–American War, and later in the Battle of Peking during the Boxer Rebellion.

References

Sources

1846 births
1918 deaths
American theatre managers and producers
Businesspeople from Rochester, New York
Metropolitan Opera people
19th-century American businesspeople